Toro y Ferrer was an architectural firm and one of the principal exponents of Puerto Rico's tropical modernism. Founded in 1945 by Osvaldo Toro FAIA (1914–1995), Miguel Ferrer FAIA (1914–2005) and Luis Torregrosa Casellas, the firm designed some of Puerto Rico's most significant modern landmarks. The firm is known for its synthesis of the principles of the Modern Movement adapted to the tropical conditions of the Island. Major works include the Caribe Hilton Hotel (1945), the Aeropuerto Internacional de Isla Verde (1955), the Corte Suprema (Puerto Rico Supreme Court) (1955), the House of Representatives' Annex Buildings (1955) and the Hotel La Concha (1958).

Osvaldo Toro FAIA (1914–1995) studied architecture at Columbia University, graduating in 1937. Miguel Ferrer FAIA (1914–2005) studied architecture at Cornell University, graduating in 1938. Both were members of the College of Fellows of the American Institute of Architects and recipients of the Henry Klumb Award in 1986.

The firm was known by various names including Toro Ferrer y Torregrosa before settling on Toro-Ferrer.

Major works
 1946 Residencia Rodríguez, San Juan, Puerto Rico
 1949 Caribe Hilton Hotel, San Juan, Puerto Rico
 1955 Oficinas Legislativas, San Juan, Puerto Rico
 1955 Supreme Court Building, San Juan, Puerto Rico
 1958 Hotel La Concha, San Juan, Puerto Rico
 1959 Cesar Calderón Residence, San Juan, Puerto Rico
 1963 Puerto Rico-Sheraton Hotel, San Juan, Puerto Rico
 1965 William Pomeroy Residence, Dorado, Puerto Rico
 1967 Hilton Curaçao, Curaçao, Netherlands Antilles

Exhibitions
 Toro Ferrer Torregrosa 1945–1955
By Archivos de Arquitectura y Construcción de la Universidad de Puerto Rico - AACUPR

Toro y Ferrer's Papers
The Architecture and Construction Archives at the University of Puerto Rico (AACUPR) conserves the Toro y Ferrer Collection (1938-1984). Approximately 98 cubic feet in size, the collection contains architectural drawings, photographs, presentation boards, project albums, and textual documents. The Architectural Drawing Series holds 267 projects organized chronologically. The collection was donated by architects Osvaldo Toro and Miguel Ferrer in 1990.

See also

 List of Puerto Ricans
 Architecture of Puerto Rico

References

Further reading

External links
The Toro y Ferrer Collection electronic finding aid may be consulted through http://hip.upr.edu:85/ipac20/ipac.jsp?profile=aac--1#focus

Architecture firms of the United States
Companies of Puerto Rico